Patrick Joseph O'Shaughnessy (1872 – 29 December 1920) was an Irish nationalist politician and Member of Parliament (MP) in the House of Commons of the United Kingdom of Great Britain and Ireland.

He was first elected unopposed as the Irish Parliamentary Party MP for the County Limerick West constituency at the 1900 general election. He was re-elected at the 1906, January 1910 and December 1910 general elections. He lost his seat at the 1918 general election.

External links

1872 births
1920 deaths
Irish Parliamentary Party MPs
Members of the Parliament of the United Kingdom for County Limerick constituencies (1801–1922)
UK MPs 1900–1906
UK MPs 1906–1910
UK MPs 1910
UK MPs 1910–1918